Peter McGinnity (born October 1953) is a Gaelic football manager and former player who hails from Roslea in County Fermanagh, Northern Ireland.Peter McGinnity targets club wins in two counties |url=http://www.belfasttelegraph.co.uk/sport/gaa/peter-mcginnity--targets-club-wins-in-two-counties-14946296.html?r=RSS |work=Belfast Telegraph |date=11 September 2010 |accessdate=13 November 2010 }}</ref>

Career
Peter McGinnity from Roslea played for Fermanagh for the best part of twenty years. He captained Ulster to two Railway Cups and also won two others. He won three SFCs with his native Roslea Shamrocks as well as three (in three years!) in Antrim with St John's, Belfast. With the latter, he won an Ulster club championship and played in an All-Ireland club final.

He played for his county at under 21 level for five years, winning two Ulster championships and contesting back-to-back All-Ireland finals. He also played in two Ulster minor deciders.

October 1953: Peter McGinnity is born in Roslea, County Fermanagh.

Fast-forward almost 45 years to autumn 1998: he plays his last game of football, helping his club win an intermediate championship final . . . an incredible 30 years after first donning the colours of the south county club.

Peter was only 14 when he broke onto the Roslea first team in 1968. He spent virtually his entire club career with the Shamrocks, apart from three years in Belfast with St John’s, 1976-79.

The IFC garnered in ’98 was McGinnity’s second, his first adult success with Roslea arriving a quarter of a century earlier in 1973 when an intermediate league and championship double was plucked.
Outside the adult team, Peter also collected two county U21 championships and a Fermanagh minor league memento.

During the ’80s, Roslea really came to the fore and senior championship successes were recorded in 1982, ’84 and ’86. Peter also played in the county finals of ’83, ’87 and ’89 and was on the Roslea side that clinched six successive senior league titles.

Nineteen-eighty-four stood out as a landmark year, as the Shamrocks marked the Association’s 100th birthday in fine style.

Meanwhile, with Fermanagh, Peter won an Ulster minor league in 1970 and featured on the sides beaten by Derry and Tyrone respectively in the Ulster MFC finals of ’70 and ’71.

In those same two years, however, the Erne County had more luck at under 21 level, collecting both Ulster titles en route to successive All-Ireland final appearances against mighty Cork.

He played for the county at all levels in 1970, breaking onto the senior side for the national league in autumn.

He played his last game for the county seniors in the national league against Laois in 1991, under PJ McGowan. By all accounts, that was something of an isolated appearance in the green jersey as McGinnity had missed a couple of years prior to then with knee and hip injuries.

But he had been a regular with Fermanagh right through from 1970 until 1988/89.

The highlight was 1982 when Fermanagh got to the Ulster final for the first time since 1945. They came closer than they’ve ever done to winning the Anglo-Celt Cup too, losing to Armagh by a mere three points, 0-10 to 1-4.

Peter had a 100% record in Antrim club football. In three seasons with St John’s, he scooped three county senior league and championship doubles.

In the 1977/78 Ulster club final, the Belfast outfit defeated Cavan Gaels by 2-10 to 2-2 at Castleblayney. At Corrigan Park in Belfast, they subsequently accounted for Kingdom (London) and Summerhill (Meath) in All-Ireland club quarter-final and semi-final meetings, winning those matches by ten and 13 points respectively.

The All-Ireland final took place in Croke Park on 26 March 1978 and St John’s were overpowered by a Thomond College, Limerick combination including Pat Spillane and Brian Talty in their ranks.
Peter and his St John’s teammates returned to the provincial club final stage in December of that same year but this time lost out to Monaghan champions Scotstown.

The former Roslea/St John’s/Fermanagh/Ulster midfielder/half forward also had a lengthy schools, colleges and university career. He starred for St Michael’s, lining out in two McRory finals in ’69 and ’70 and was also on the only Michaels team to garner the Ranafast Cup, in 1970.

He won a Ryan Cup and a couple of Trench Cups with St Mary’s Belfast and was midfield on the Queens side that faced UCD in the 1975 Sigerson final, marking John O’Keeffe that particular day. Peter also had the distinction of representing the Combined Colleges team.

On qualifying as a PE instructor in 1976, Peter taught in Belfast for three years before returning to his own alma mater of St Michael’s, where he has remained since.

He began his coaching career with the Michaels and also coached Roslea at different times in the eighties. He was player-manager of Fermanagh in 1986-87 and also managed Tyrone club Killyclogher - who were intermediate at the time - in the early-to-mid nineties. During that time, he took some coaching sessions with the Tyrone team that won back-to-back Ulster championships in 1995-96.
After managing Leitrim for a while, he returned to Killyclogher (who had since gone senior) and led them to the 1999 Tyrone Senior Football Championship final against Carrickmore before eventually winning a Senior League title and the coveted Tyrone Senior Football Championship in 2003 - defeating Errigal Ciaran in the final.

Coaching Roles

 Manager/coach - Roslea, Fermanagh. Senior & Junior Club teams.      2006 - 2012
 Coach – Fermanagh Development Squads.			             2005 - 2012
 Manager/coach – Errigal Ciaran, Tyrone. Senior Club team.	     2005
 Manager/coach – Killyclogher, Tyrone. Senior Club team. 	     1999 – 2004 & 1996 - 1997
 Coach - International Rules team. 				     2002 - 2003
 Coach - Tyrone Senior County team.				     2001 – 2002 & 1996 - 1998
 Manager/coach -  Leitrim Senior County & U21 teams. 		     1998 - 1999
 Level 2 Coaching Qualification.     Connacht Council initiative.     1998	
 Coach – Aghavas. Leitrim. Senior Club team. 			     1997
 Manager/coach - Roslea, Fermanagh. Senior Club team. 		     1992 - 1994
 Manager/coach - Fermanagh Senior County team. 			     1985 - 1986.
 Manager/coach - Fermanagh U-21 team. 				     1982
 Manager/coach - Fermanagh Minor team. 				     1980 - 1981.
Manager - Aghyaran St Davog's Tyrone. 2014–present

Honours

Player
Fermanagh
 Ulster Under-21 Football Championship (2): 1970, 1971
 Dr McKenna Cup (1): 1977

Roslea Shamrocks
 Fermanagh Senior Football Championship (3): 1982, 1984, 1986
 Fermanagh Intermediate Football Championship (2): 1973, 1998

St John's
 Ulster Senior Club Football Championship (1): 1977
 Antrim Senior Football Championship (3): 1976, 1977, 1978

Ulster
 Railway Cup (4): 1979, 1980 (c), 1983 (c), 1984

Individual
 All Star Award (1): 1982

Manager
Roslea Shamrocks
 Fermanagh Senior Football Championship (3): 2010, 2011, 2013

Killyclogher
 Tyrone Senior Football Championship (1): 2003

St Michael's College
 MacRory Cup (1): 1992

References

1953 births
Living people
Fermanagh inter-county Gaelic footballers
Gaelic football managers
Roslea Shamrocks Gaelic footballers
St John's (Antrim) Gaelic footballers